Simone Berardi (born 30 October 1979 in Rome) is an Italian former footballer who played as a midfielder. He appeared in the third and fourth tiers of football in Italy.

See also
List of football clubs in Italy

References

External links
 Simone Berardi's profile on San Marino Calcio's official website

1979 births
Italian footballers
Living people
U.S. Pergolettese 1932 players
Vastese Calcio 1902 players
A.S.D. Victor San Marino players
Potenza S.C. players
Association football midfielders